Waddesdon is a closed station that served the village of Waddesdon and its manor, to the north of Aylesbury in Buckinghamshire, England. The station is not to be confused with Waddesdon Road railway station at the other end of the Waddesdon Manor estate on the Brill Tramway.

History

The station was first opened as Waddesdon Manor by the Metropolitan Railway on 1 January 1897. "Manor"  was dropped from the name on 1 October 1922.

The Metropolitan Railway amalgamated with several other transport companies to form the London Passenger Transport Board in 1933. The station was closed on 6 July 1936 when their services were curtailed at Aylesbury.

While open, the station was also served by former Great Central Main Line (running on the same tracks as the Metropolitan line as far as Quainton Road) which was not itself closed to passengers until 1966, under the Beeching Axe.

Today one platform of the station (on the side remote from the remaining track) remains; the other has been demolished. Until 2021 the line was used for a daily freight train carrying waste from London to Calvert, as well as special services between Aylesbury and Quainton Road for events at the Buckinghamshire Railway Centre.

Routes

References

External links

Disused railway stations in Buckinghamshire
Metropolitan line stations
Disused London Underground stations
Former Metropolitan and Great Central Joint Railway stations
Railway stations in Great Britain opened in 1897
Railway stations in Great Britain closed in 1936
Waddesdon Manor